Karolina Ericsson (born 5 June 1973) is a retired Swedish badminton player. She represented her country in the World Championships in the years 1997 and 1999. Ericsson also qualified to compete at the 1998 World Grand Prix Finals in Bandar Seri Begawan, Brunei.

Achievements

European Junior Championships 
Girls' doubles

IBF International 
Women's singles

Women's doubles

References

External links 

1973 births
Living people
Swedish female badminton players
20th-century Swedish women